A cart is a two-wheeled vehicle or device designed for transport.

Cart may also refer to:

 Cart (film)
 Carts (film)
 River Cart, a river in Scotland
 Fidelipac, a type of audio tape cartridge used in broadcasting
 ROM cartridge, a removable component of an electronic device
 Baggage cart
 Golf cart
 Shopping cart
 Sling cart

See also

CART (disambiguation)
Kart (disambiguation)
Cartridge (disambiguation)
 Cartesian (disambiguation)
 Cartes (disambiguation)
 Carte (disambiguation)